The IMOCA 60 class yacht Gartmore Investment, GBR 55 was designed by Finot-Conq, and launched in May 1998 after being made by JMV Industries in Cherbourg, France. Note during 1996-1997 the IMOCA 60 Coyote was branded Gartmore while this boat was being built.

Racing results

References

1990s sailing yachts
Sailing yachts designed by Finot-Conq
Sailboat type designs by Groupe Finot
Vendée Globe boats
IMOCA 60
Sailboat types built in France